Cuéntame un cuento (English: Tell me a story) is a Spanish anthology television series. It consists of twisted remakes of traditional fairy tales in a modern-day setting.

In 2018, the American television series Tell Me a Story, based on Cuéntame un cuento, premiered.

Premise 
The series attempted to retell old fairy tales "to show its relevance in the 21st century with a new approach".

Cast 
Los tres cerditos

 Víctor Clavijo as Andrés.
  as Chino.
 Arturo Valls as Nano.
  as Rulo.
 Elena Ballesteros as Elena.
 Luis Zahera as Ramírez.
Blancanieves

 Blanca Suárez as Nieves.
 Mar Saura as Eva.
  as Diego.
 Félix Gómez as Marko.
Caperucita roja

 Laia Costa as Claudia.
 Lola Cordón as Claudia's grand mother.
  as Joaquín.
 Sonia Almarcha as Claudia's mother.
 Sara Mata as Claudia's cousin.
 Susana Abaitua as Claudia's friend.
 Javier Godino as Antonio.
  as Fran.

Hansel y Gretel

 Blanca Portillo as Sara Morgade (la bruja)
  as Hansel
 Aitana Hercal as Gretel
La bella y la bestia

 Aitor Luna as Iván Dorado.
 Michelle Jenner as Miranda.
 Laura Pamplona as Diana.

Production and release 
Produced by Eyeworks España for Antena 3, Edi Walter and Fernando Bassi were credited as executive producers. "Los tres cerditos" was directed by Miguel Ángel Vivas, "Blancanieves" by Iñaki Peñafiel, "Caperucita Roja" by Fernando Bassi, "Hansel y Gretel" by Salvador Calvo, and "La bella y la bestia" by Alberto Ruiz Rojo. Shot in 2011, the series was shelved by Antena 3 for a while. The broadcasting run lasted from 10 November 2014 to 8 December 2014.

The series sparked an American remake developed by Kevin Williamson: Tell Me a Story.

Awards and nominations 

|-
| align = "center" |2014 || 16th  || Best Spanish Fiction || "Los tres cerditos" ||  || 
|-
| align = "center" | 2015 || 24th Actors and Actresses Union Awards || Best Television Actor in a Leading Role || Víctor Clavijo ||  || 
|}

References 

2014 Spanish television series debuts
2014 Spanish television series endings
Spanish-language television shows
2010s Spanish drama television series
2010s anthology television series
Antena 3 (Spanish TV channel) network series
Spanish anthology television series